Copelatus insolitus is a species of diving beetle. It is part of the genus Copelatus in the subfamily Copelatinae of the family Dytiscidae. It was described by Chevrolat in 1863.

References

insolitus
Beetles described in 1863